Brijendra Pratap Singh (born 29 August 1967) is an Indian politician, who represents Panna constituency in the Madhya Pradesh Legislative Assembly. He is a member of the Bhartiya Janta Party. Since 2021, he as served as minister in the of Mineral Resources and Labour Department. He was elected as a member of the Madhya Pradesh Legislative Assembly in 2018 from the constituency Panna (60).

He served as Minister of State (Independent Charge) for Farmers' Development and Agriculture Welfare and Tourism and Public Service Management in the Government of Madhya Pradesh during the tenure from 2009 to 2013. During this tenure, he also held the additional charge of Sports and Youth Welfare.

Education 
He completed his schooling (1986) from Daly College, Indore, and then got his B.Com. degree from a Barkatullah University in Bhopal. He completed his L.L.B. from Awdesh Pratap Singh University in Rewa, Madhya Pradesh. He received the best student award in Daly College, Indore in the year 1985–1986.

Political life 
He won his first elections in the year 2003 from Pawai Constituency of Madhya Pradesh. He was the first leader from the BJP to win in that constituency. He got re-elected in 2008. In 2009, there was an extension in Shivraj Singh Chauhan's cabinet wherein he was appointed as the State Minister with a portfolio of Farmer Welfare and Agriculture Department. After a year, he was also made in charge of the Department of Public Service Management. In early 2013, due to the illness of senior cabinet minister Tukoji Rao Pawar, the departments of Tourism and Sports and Youth Welfare were also transferred to him.

In 2018, he got his ticket from Panna Constituency of Madhya Pradesh. With Rural Development being his major agenda, he campaigned and won the elections with a good margin. He now continues to be the MLA from Panna.

References

External links 
 Brijendra Pratap Singh Biography - About, Personal
 Department of Public Relations:: Madhya Pradesh
 15th Madhya Pradesh Assembly

Madhya Pradesh MLAs 2003–2008
People from Panna district
Madhya Pradesh MLAs 2008–2013
Madhya Pradesh MLAs 2018–2023
Bharatiya Janata Party politicians from Madhya Pradesh
1967 births
Living people